"Weight of the World" is a song by American rock band Evanescence, from their second studio album, The Open Door (2006). It was released as a promotional single in October 2007 to the country of Colombia. It was written by Amy Lee and Terry Balsamo while the production was handled by Dave Fortman, and Lee wrote it about the pressure fans put on her. "Weight of the World" received positive reception from music critics, who praised the song for its heaviness. The song was added to the set list on Evanescence's The Open Door Tour (2006–07) and Evanescence Tour (2011–12).

Background and release 
"Weight of the World" was written by Amy Lee and Terry Balsamo while the production was handled by Dave Fortman. It was recorded in Record Plant Studios, Los Angeles, mixed by Dave Fortman at Ocean Way Recording, Los Angeles and mastered by Ted Jensen at Sterling Sound, New York. When asked about the song, Lee stated that many people thought that the songs on The Open Door would be similar to "My Immortal" (2003) due to the band's line-up changes, but explained that "My Immortal" was former member Ben Moody's song, and that she "was always trying to pull [the band] in a crazier direction". She further explained the inspiration of the song in another interview:

"'Weight of the World' is a song about feeling the pressure of that and I love our fans and I don't mean, get off my back, I don't want this pressure. It's interesting, playing shows and meeting fans after the show and going to the different Web sites, the fan sites and seeing all these personal experiences that people are sharing and all the advice and answers to questions that they are trying to get from me. I do answer sometimes and I do want to go on. I do want to be there for people and tell them what I think but at the same time, I'm not a therapist and I'm not a doctor and I don't have all the answers for the meaning of life. That's the thing about our music is that it's deep and I'm trying to find the answers and I guess in that song I was really expressing that this is kind of a lot of pressure sometimes and I wanted to definitely say to all those fans, I'm not a prophet and I don't have all the answers, so you really need to look within yourself and start that journey on your own."

"Weight of the World" was released to Colombia and Venezuela in 2007 as a promotional single.

Composition and lyrics 
According to the sheet music published on the website Musicnotes.com by Alfred Music Publishing, "Weight of the World" is an alternative metal, gothic rock and post-grunge song, set in common time and performed in moderate driving rock tempo of 112 beats per minute. It is written in the key of C# Minor and Lee's vocals for the song range from the musical note of G#3 to C#6. The Courier-Mails Jason Nahrung concluded that "Weight of the World" "exploits the formula of thumping chorus and gentle verse". Danielle Baudhuin from The Oshkosh West Index wrote, "Pressures of fame and such are present in 'Weight of the World,' with lyrics like, 'Feels like the weight of the world/like God in heaven gave me a turn.' Any faux-depressed teenager can relate." Andree Farias from Christianity Today stated, "the singer tells a needy co-dependent, 'Feels like the weight of the world / Like God in heaven gave me a turn / Don't cling to me, I swear I fix you,' only to tell him a few lines later, 'If you love me, then let go of me / I won't be held down by who I used to be.'"

Reception 
While reviewing The Open Door, Ed Thompson of IGN put "Weight of the World" in his "Definitely Download" list, along with "Call Me When You're Sober", "Sweet Sacrifice" and "Lacrymosa". The Washington Posts Richard Harrington wrote that "There's no shortage of soaring, dynamic rockers on 'The Open Door,' including 'Sweet Sacrifice,' 'Weight of the World,' 'Snow White Queen' and 'Lacrymosa.'" A writer for Sputnikmusic wrote that "Lose Control" and "Weight of the World" "are two of the better songs [on The Open Door] guitar wise". The writer also said that the drumming on "Weight of the World" "is pretty much the best stuff [Rocky Gray] does on the album".

Live performances 

"Weight of the World" was added to the set-list to support The Open Door (2006–07). Some of these performances include the show at Hammerstein Ballroom in New York in October 2006, and the show in Dunkin' Donuts Center in Providence, Rhode Island on April 4, 2007. The song was played live at their secret New York gig which took place on November 4, 2009.

"Weight of the World" was later added to the set-list to support Evanescence (2011–12). Performances include the concert at War Memorial Auditorium in Nashville, Tennessee on August 17, 2011, and the concert at Porto Alegre, Brazil on October 4, 2012. While reviewing a concert, Rick Florino of Artistdirect wrote, "Staccato thrashing added an edge to "Weight of the World" as Balsamo and McLawhorn's guitars sliced through a hypnotic hum".

Usage in media 
"Weight of the World" was released for download on Rock Band 3, along with "Call Me When You're Sober" and "Bring Me to Life".

Credits and personnel 
Credits adapted from The Open Door liner notes.

Songwriting – Amy Lee, Terry Balsamo
Production, mixing – Dave Fortman
Instruments  – Amy Lee, Terry Balsamo
Programming - DJ Lethal
Engineering - Jeremy Parker
Mastering - Ted Jensen
Vocals, keyboards – Amy Lee
Lead guitar – Terry Balsamo
Rhythm guitar – John LeCompt
Bass guitar – Will Boyd
Drums – Rocky Gray

References

External links 
 

2007 singles
2006 songs
Evanescence songs
Songs written by Amy Lee
Wind-up Records singles
Songs written by Terry Balsamo
Gothic rock songs